Cyanothamnus occidentalis, commonly known as the rock boronia, is a plant in the citrus family Rutaceae and is endemic to eastern Australia. It is an erect, woody shrub with pinnate or bipinnate leaves and groups of up to three white to pale pink, pink four-petalled flowers arranged in leaf axils.

Description
It has pinnate or bipinnate leaves with between three and seven leaflets. The eight stamens are hairy on their edges and the stigma is tiny, no wider than the style.

Taxonomy and naming
This species was first formally described in 2003 by Marco F. Duretto from a specimen collected in the Wondul Range National Park and the description was published in Muelleria. In a 2013 paper in the journal Taxon, Marco Duretto and others changed the name to Cyanothamnus occidentalis on the basis of cladistic analysis. The specific epithet (occidentalis) is a Latin word meaning "western", alluding to the fact that in most places, this species has a more westerly distribution than that of other boronias.

Distribution and habitat
The rock boronia is one of the most widespread boronias and is found between Mount Sturgeon near Hughenden in north Queensland and Dubbo in New South Wales. It mostly grows in woodland on sandstone or in sandy soil.

Conservation
Cyanothamnus occidentalis (as Boronia occidentalis) is listed as of "least concern" by the Queensland Government Department of Environment and Science.

References 

occidentalis
Flora of New South Wales
Flora of Queensland
Plants described in 2003
Taxa named by Marco Duretto